Flavobacterium flaviflagrans is a Gram-negative, aerobic, non-spore-forming, rod-shaped and non-motile bacterium from the genus of Flavobacterium which has been isolated from forest soil near the Kyonggi University  in Korea.

References

External links
Type strain of Flavobacterium flaviflagrans at BacDive -  the Bacterial Diversity Metadatabase

flaviflagrans
Bacteria described in 2017